Merauke Regency is a regency in the far south of the Indonesian province of South Papua. It covers an area of 46,791.63 km2, and had a population of 195,716 at the 2010 Census and 230,932 at the 2020 Census; the official estimate as at mid 2021 was 231,696, comprising 121,078 males and 110,618 female inhabitants. The administrative centre is the town of Merauke; this was projected since 2013 to become an independent city (kota) separate from Merauke Regency, but the alteration has been deferred. It is also the provincial capital of South Papua since 2022. It is the largest regency in Indonesia, with an area of 46,791 km2, slightly larger than Estonia.

History
The regency formerly covered a much wider area of southern Papua, but much of the area was split off on 12 November 2002 to form the new Regencies of Asmat, Mappi and Boven Digoel. These regencies have in 2022 been re-grouped to form the new South Papua Province.

Demographics

Ethnicity
One of the tribes originating from Merauke are the Marind (or also called the Marind Anim) and the Sohoers. There are various sub-clans of the Marind Anim tribe, such as Kaize, Gebze, Balagaize, Mahuze, Ndiken, and Basik-basik.

In Dutch colonial period, the local residents lived side by side with the Dutch government employees. After the Western New Guinea integration with Indonesia, the development of the regency then followed by a population increase coming from various regions in the country. As of 2010 Indonesian census male population data, the population of indigenous Papuans in Merauke Regency is 37,731 (36.60%), while non-native Papuans is 65,347 (63.40%).

Religion

A 2021 data from Central Agency on Statistics of Merauke Regency indicates that the majority of Merauke Regency population adheres to Christianity (52.84%). The Catholics makes up the majority of them (36.61%) and the remainings are Protestants (16.23%). Another significant religions in the regency is Islam (46.56%), followed by Buddhism (0.44%) and Hindu (0.16%).

Administrative districts

Merauke Regency comprises twenty districts (distrik), listed below with their areas and populations at the 2010 Census and the 2020 Census, together with the official estimates as at mid 2021. The table also includes the location of the district administrative centres, the number of administrative villages in each district (rural desa and urban kelurahan) and its post code.

Forests
Much of the area of Merauke Regency is covered by forests. The Wasur National Park forms part of the largest wetland in the regency.

MIFEE (Merauke Integrated Food and Energy Estate) is a project for use of a big area for industry and also palm oil and food crops agriculture including land grabbing. MIFEE is supported by the national government. There is much indigenous opposition to the MIFEE project. The MIFEE project is expected to cover a 1.2 million hectare area, or a quarter of Merauke. The project threatens conservation areas, such as virgin forests and water catchment areas, as well as the habitat of indigenous peoples in Papua. There were substantial forest fires.

By May 2011, Indonesian government allocated around two million hectares in the regency to 36 national and international corporations for oil palm, timber, and sugarcane enterprises.

Transportation

Merauke Regency is equipped by a passenger port, serving Pelni ships, as well as Mopah International Airport serving domestic flights.

See also
Merauke Five

References

External links

Statistics publications from Statistics Indonesia (BPS)

Regencies of South Papua